The Geoffrey Dearmer Award is an annual poetry prize founded in 1997 and run by the Poetry Society in memory of the poet Geoffrey Dearmer (1893–1996), who at 103 was the Society's oldest member. By establishing an endowment fund, the Dearmer family has enabled the Poetry Society to award an annual prize to the best poem in The Poetry Review by a poet who had not, before the issue in which their work appeared, published a collection. The winner of the prize is announced in the summer issue of The Poetry Review.

Awards

2013 Mir Mahfuz Ali
2012 Kayo Chingonyi
2011 Denise Saul
2010 Kim Moore
2009 Maitreyabandhu
2008 Kearan Williams
2007 Neetha Kunaratnam
2006 Tamara Fulcher
2005 Andrew Bailey
2004 Lucie McKee
2003 Rebecca O'Connor
2002 David Gravender
2001 Michael Murphy
2000 Anna Wigley
1999 Sarah Wardle
1998 Paul Farley

About the Poetry Society

The Poetry Society's mission is to advance the study, use and enjoyment of poetry.

The Poetry Society was founded in 1909 to 'promote "a more general recognition and appreciation of poetry". Since then, it has grown into one of Britain's most dynamic arts organisations, representing British poetry both nationally and internationally. Today it has nearly 4000 members worldwide and publishes the leading poetry magazine, The Poetry Review.

References

External links
Geoffrey Dearmer Prize Main Page
The Poetry Society

British poetry awards
Literary awards honoring unpublished books or writers
Awards established in 1997
1997 establishments in the United Kingdom